Ranunculus ambigens, common names water-plantain spearwort, water plantain, and spearwort, is a plant found in the eastern part of North America. It is listed as endangered in Connecticut, and New Hampshire; as endangered and extirpated in Maryland; as a special concern in Kentucky; as possibly extirpated in Maine; as threatened in Michigan; and as a special concern in Rhode Island.

References
  

ambigens
Flora of North America